A by-election was held in the Dáil Éireann Tipperary South constituency in Ireland on 30 June 2001. It followed the death of  Fine Gael Teachta Dála (TD) Theresa Ahearn on  20 September 2000.

The election was won by Fine Gael Senator Tom Hayes. The other candidates being Phil Prendergast standing as an Independent, Michael Maguire for Fianna Fáil and Denis Landy for the Labour Party. Prendergast, Maguire and Landy were all members of South Tipperary County Council at the time.

This was the second by-election in Tipperary South during the 28th Dáil.

Result

See also
List of Dáil by-elections
Dáil constituencies

References

External links
https://electionsireland.org/result.cfm?election=1997B&cons=219&ref=121
http://irelandelection.com/election.php?elecid=95&constitid=48&electype=2
https://www.rte.ie/news/2001/0701/16494-byelection/
https://books.google.ie/books?id=ddQrBgAAQBAJ&pg=PA26&lpg=PA26&dq=2001+tipperary+south+by+election+result&source=bl&ots=KwujJ_mW8-&sig=ACfU3U2luD4b0KQS6UlLqVv9cBTFuxZn8A&hl=en&sa=X&ved=2ahUKEwjH3ujivfTlAhViRxUIHRgrB7kQ6AEwCnoECAkQAQ#v=onepage&q=2001%20tipperary%20south%20by%20election%20result&f=false

2001 in Irish politics
2001 elections in the Republic of Ireland
28th Dáil
By-elections in the Republic of Ireland
Elections in County Tipperary
June 2001 events in Europe